Correos de El Salvador is the national post office of El Salvador.

References

External links

Communications in El Salvador

El Salvador